Jean-Pierre Chaline (18 December 1939, Orléans), is a French contemporary historian, a specialist of the history of the French Third Republic.

Biography 
The father of Olivier Chaline, a historian specializing in Central Europe in the modern era. and husband of Nadine-Josette Chaline, herself an historian, Jean-Pierre Chalibe is emeritus professor at the Paris-Sorbonne University.

Jean-Pierre Chaline was awarded several prizes by the Académie française:
Prix Alfred Née in 1984 for Les bourgeois de Rouen. Une élite urbaine au XIXe siècle
Prix René Petiet in 1987 for L’Affaire Noiret
Prix Biguet in 1996 for Sociabilité et érudition. Les Sociétés savantes en France.

On 14 December 2015, he was elevated to the rank of chevalier of the Ordre des Arts et des Lettres.

Main works 
1977: Deux bourgeois en leur temps. documents sur la société rouennaise du XIXe, Picard,  ;
1982: Les Bourgeois de Rouen : Une élite urbaine au XIXe, Paris,  ;
1998: La Restauration française, series Que sais-je ?, Presses universitaires de France, Paris,  ;
1999: Les Sociétés savantes, Aubier Montaigne, 
2003: Lycées et lycéens normands au XIXe, Société de l'histoire de Normandie, 
2004: Rouen, intelligence d'une ville, Ouest-France, 
2009: Les Dynasties normandes, Éditions Perrin,

External links 
  Jean-Pierre Chaline, La Restauration (compte rendu) on Persée
 Publications on CAIRN
 Jean-Pierre Chaline on France Culture
 Jean-Pierre Chaline on the site of the Académie française

20th-century French historians
21st-century French historians
Chevaliers of the Ordre des Arts et des Lettres
1939 births
Writers from Orléans
Living people